Gheorghe Papuc (born 6 May 1954) is a Moldovan politician.

Biography 
He was born in early May in the city of Ungheni, an area west of Chisnau in the Moldovan SSR. After graduating from the high school in 1971, he enrolled in the Soviet Armed Forces. In 1978, he graduated from the Felix Dzherzhinsky Military High School in Saratov. After studying there, he began to enroll in a Russian law school. Papuc began to become more active in the Ministry of Internal Affairs of the USSR. In 1991, he graduated from the Tashkent MVD High School (now the Academy of the Ministry of Internal Affairs of Uzbekistan). Between 1992 and 1997, Papuc held leading positions in the MAI of Moldova and the MVD in the Russian Federation, leading several detached units in the Kabardino-Balkaria. He returned to Moldova in 1997 to lead a special operations brigade in the armed forces. He became the Moldovan Minister of the Interior on 27 February 2002, and would serve in this position until 31 March 2008 and serve a second time from 27 October 2008 - 25 September 2009.

References

External links
Official website

1954 births
Living people
People from Ungheni District
Moldovan Ministers of the Interior
Communist Party of Moldavia politicians
Moldovan jurists
Party of Communists of the Republic of Moldova politicians